The Hildesheim loop (German: Hildesheimer Schleife), also known as the Sorsum curve or the Hildesheim curve, is a 3.7 km long German passenger railway. It is single-track and electrified throughout. The line was opened in 1991.

Route 

The southern end of the line branches off the Hanover–Würzburg high-speed line at Sorsum junction, 29.5 km south of Hanover. The loop leaves running northeast from the HSL, which is running to the northwest. At Himmelsthür junction, 4.7 km west of Hildesheim, it connects with the double-track line from Hanover and Nordstemmen to Hildesheim, which runs east–west, at the 45.4 km mark. There is a down grade towards Hildesheim.

The line connects the high-speed line with Hildesheim station, conveying Intercity-Express trains running between Frankfurt am Main and Berlin. ICE trains run from Hildesheim to Brunswick and the Weddel loop to Wolfsburg and Berlin via the Hanover–Berlin high-speed line. During the day, trains run hourly both ways on the loop.

References

Railway lines in Lower Saxony
High-speed railway lines in Germany
Railway lines opened in 1991
1991 establishments in Germany
Buildings and structures in Hildesheim